Kevin Legg is a retired American soccer midfielder who played professionally in the USL A-League, Continental Indoor Soccer League and National Professional Soccer League.

Legg attended the University of San Diego, playing only three seasons (1991 -1993) before turning professional.  In 1994, he signed with the San Diego Sockers of the Continental Indoor Soccer League.    On July 22, 1994, the Sockers loaned Legg to the Detroit Neon for the rest of the season.  Legg returned to the Sockers for the 1995 season.  On May 18, 1996, the Sockers traded Legg to the Detroit Neon for the first pick in the CISL Supplemental Draft.  In the fall of 1996, Legg joined the Tampa Bay Terror of the National Professional Soccer League.  In 1997, he played for the Portland Pride in the CISL.  In 1998, Legg moved outdoors with the San Diego Flash of the USISL A-League.  He would play four seasons with the Flash.  In the fall of 1998, Legg joined the Kansas City Attack.  The Attack waived him on December 2, 1998.  He then briefly played for the Portland Pythons of the World Indoor Soccer League.  In January 2000, the Los Angeles Galaxy called up Legg for the 2000 CONCACAF Champions' Cup.  In April 2001, Legg joined the expansion Portland Timbers.  Legg broke his toe early in the season, limiting his playing time.  On July 27, 2001, the Timbers released Legg.  In 2003, Legg joined the second San Diego Sockers for one season in the second Major Indoor Soccer League.

References

Living people
1972 births
American soccer players
Continental Indoor Soccer League players
Kansas City Attack players
Major Indoor Soccer League (2001–2008) players
National Professional Soccer League (1984–2001) players
Portland Timbers (2001–2010) players
Portland Pride players
Portland Pythons players
San Diego Flash players
San Diego Sockers (CISL) players
San Diego Sockers (2001–2004) players
San Diego Toreros men's soccer players
Tampa Bay Terror players
A-League (1995–2004) players
World Indoor Soccer League players
Association football midfielders